Shaggfest is an annual outdoor music festival held in Virginia Beach, Virginia, USA. It is presented by the Virginia-based radio station Z104 in partnership with Live Nation Entertainment. The event features many genres of music, including pop, hip hop indie and electronic dance music. Shaggfest has two stages where national and established musical artists, as well as local artists perform for fans.

Background
Shaggfest was founded by Brandon Stokes, also known as the radio personality and Virginia Beach local Shaggy, in 2011. It takes place in Virginia Beach, within Tidewater, the southeast area of Virginia. The festival is hosted at the Veterans United Home Loans Amphitheater, which seats approximately 20,000 people.

Line-ups by year

2011

Skillz
Audra The Rapper
Petey Pablo
MIMS
Nickelus F

2012
Shaggfest took place at the Virginia Beach Sportsplex on June 9, 2012. The official line-up was announced on May 14, 2012.

Timbaland
Skillz
Teddy Riley
Blackstreet
Chiddy Bang
Kirko Bangz
Fam-Lay
Bison 
T. Mills
Missy Elliott
Slim 112
Bei Maejor
Dev

2013

J. Cole
Kid Ink
Juicy J
Travis Mills
B. Smyth
Pusha T
We Never Sleep

2014

Pharrell Williams
August Alsina
Rico Love
Mack Wilds
No Malice
Sean Paul
Chris Richardson

2015

Trey Songz
Ma$e
Timbaland
DMX (cancelled)
Jidenna
Sage the Gemini (cancelled) 
Tink
Young Money Yawn
Nay Nay & Bryan Mahon

2016

Diplo
Travis Scott
Lil Dicky
Pusha T
Eric Stanley
Daya
Lex
Rotimi
Andrew Hypes
Bia
Evan Barlow
J.R.Clark
Nay Nay & Bryan Mahon

Tha Wave

2017

Fetty Wap
ASAP Ferg
Ashanti
Amine (rapper)
Kyle (musician)
Aaron Carter

2018 

 NERD
 French Montana
 MGK
 Madison Beer
 Rae Sremmurd

2020
All artists who were set to perform in 2020 were deferred to 2021.

See also 

 List of festivals in the United States

References

External links 
 
 Shaggfest at Live Nation

Pop music festivals in the United States
Music festivals in Virginia
Music festivals established in 2011